Miss Côte d'Azur is a French beauty pageant which selects a representative for the Miss France national competition from the department of Alpes-Maritimes and portions of Var in the region of Provence-Alpes-Côte d'Azur (PACA). The other regional pageant within PACA is Miss Provence, which selects a representative from the other departments of PACA and the remaining portions of Var. The first Miss Côte d'Azur was crowned in 1932, although the competition was not organized regularly until 1962.

The current Miss Côte d'Azur is Flavy Barla, who was crowned Miss Côte d'Azur 2022 on 2 August 2022. Six women from the Côte d'Azur have been crowned Miss France:
Lyne de Souza, who was crowned Miss France 1933
Yvonne Viseux, who was crowned Miss France 1947
Nicole Drouin, who was crowned Miss France 1951, competing as Miss Saint-Tropez
Irène Tunc, who was crowned Miss France 1954
Michèle Boulé, who was crowned Miss France 1966, competing as Miss Cannes
Sabrina Belleval, who was crowned Miss France 1981

Results summary
Miss France: Lyne de Souza (1932); Yvonne Viseux (1946); Nicole Drouin (1950; Miss Saint-Tropez); Irène Tunc (1953); Michèle Boulé (1965; Miss Cannes); Sabrina Belleval (1980)
1st Runner-Up: Solange Dessoy (1952; Miss Lavandou); Monique Lambert (1954)
2nd Runner-Up: Patricia Lelong (1975); Patricia Sismondini (1979); Louise Prieto (2001); Charlotte Pirroni (2014); Lara Gautier (2020)
3rd Runner-Up: Mireille Cayrac (1952; Miss Toulon); Elisabeth Gandolfi (1976); Aurianne Sinacola (2013)
4th Runner-Up: Corinne Luthringer (1988); Azemina Hot (2007); Charlotte Murray (2011); Manelle Souahlia (2009)
5th Runner-Up: Flavy Barla (2022)
Top 12/Top 15: Alice Troietto (1985); Nathalie Bianchi (1987); Marie Torrente (1991); Valérie Fredon (1992); Valérie Barrière (1993); Sabine Winczewski (1995); Élodie Robert (2006); Anaïs Governatori (2009); Marine Laugier (2010); Charlotte Mint (2012); Leanna Ferrero (2015); Caroline Perengo (2018); Valeria Pavelin (2021)

Titleholders

Notes

References

External links

Miss France regional pageants
Beauty pageants in France
Women in France